Blinky's Fun Club is a children's television program blending such elements as vaudeville, puppetry, and animation that  first aired on CBS-Affiliated station KKTV in Colorado Springs, Colorado from 1958 to 1966 and then on KWGN-TV in Denver, Colorado, from 1966 to 1998. In 1998, William Ross, KWGN's general manager at the time, would cancel the series after a combined 40 year run (nine years on KKTV, and 32 years on KWGN) on Colorado television.

Program synopsis 
The star of Blinky's Fun Club was Blinky the Clown, played by Russell Scott. In the early 1980s additional characters began to appear regularly, including Otis and Zelda, played by husband and wife acting duo Michael Berg and C.J. Prince.  Children appeared on each show to celebrate their birthdays and were sung "Happy Birthday to You," (sung as Birf-Day) by Blinky.

Over 10,000 episodes, taped at KWGN's studios, initially located at Lincoln and Speer in Denver, later in Greenwood Village, aired during the show's three decades on the air. The station reportedly saved tapes of only 10 shows. KCNC and KUSA reportedly were able to get a few of the episodes out of the trash, and put them in their libraries.

References 

Culture of Denver
Culture of Colorado Springs, Colorado
1960s American children's comedy television series
1970s American children's comedy television series
1980s American children's comedy television series
1990s American children's comedy television series
1966 American television series debuts
1998 American television series endings
American television series with live action and animation
American television shows featuring puppetry
Local children's television programming in the United States
Television shows about clowns